Michael McLaverty (5 July 1904 – 22 March 1992) was an Irish writer of novels and short stories.

Background

Michael McLaverty was born in Carrickmacross, County Monaghan, to Michael McLaverty (a waiter) and Kathleen Brady.  A few years later the family moved to the Beechmount area of Belfast. He went to St Gall's, and later attended St Malachy's College and Queen's University Belfast (QUB), earning his BSc in 1927 and his MSc in 1933 for a thesis, "Earlier Work on the Passage of Electricity through Gases". 

For a short period McLaverty lived on Rathlin Island, off the County Antrim coast, where he gained much of the inspiration for his short stories. Upon marrying, he moved to Deramore Drive, Malone, Belfast. In 1928, he had got a Diploma in Education at St Mary's Teacher Training College in London. He worked as a teacher of maths and physics in Belfast for 35 years, firstly at St John's Primary School (1929-57) and then (as headmaster) at St Thomas Secondary School (1957-64).

Joe Graham in his book, Belfast Born Bred And Buttered speaks fondly of having been taught by McLaverty both at St John's and St Thomas's schools. During McLaverty's tenure at the latter, poet Seamus Heaney was one of his staff. Heaney recalled McLaverty's enthusiasm for teaching but also for literature, and McLaverty introduced him to the work of Patrick Kavanagh.

Writing
McLaverty was one of Ireland's distinguished short story writers, painting with spare intensity the northern landscape of his homeland, the hill farms, rough island terrain and the backstreets of Belfast. He focuses on moments of passion, wonder or bitter disenchantment in lives of struggle. His collected works are illustrated with woodcuts by Barbara Childs, and including an introduction by Seamus Heaney and a foreword by Sophia Hillan,

Heaney summarised McLaverty's contribution: "His voice was modestly pitched, he never sought the limelight, yet for all that, his place in our literature is secure." In the introduction to McLaverty's Collected Works, Heaney describes the writing: "His tact and pacing, in the individual sentence and the overall story, are beautiful: in his best work, the elegiac is bodied forth in perfectly pondered images and rhythms". Heaney's poem Fosterage, in the sequence Singing School from North (1975) is dedicated to him.

Collected works
 Call My Brother Back (1932)
 Lost Fields (1941)
 In This Thy Day (1945)
 Collected Short Stories (1978)
 The Circle (Business Bastard)  (2015)

See also
Irish fiction
Irish literature
List of Irish novelists

References

1904 births
1992 deaths
People from County Monaghan
People educated at St Malachy's College
20th-century Irish writers
20th-century Irish novelists
20th-century male writers
Irish male novelists